Sir Alfred David McAlpine  (6 November 1881 – 25 May 1944) was the founder of the construction company Sir Alfred McAlpine & Son.

Career
Born the son of Sir Robert McAlpine, 1st Baronet, after completing his education he served an apprenticeship across the family construction and civil engineering business.

Having been appointed to run McAlpine (Midlands) Ltd, which covered the Midlands and Northwest of England, in 1935 following the death of Sir Robert and his eldest son, Alfred ran the company independently. In 1940, it was agreed to formally separate the entities, and so the company name and the Midlands operations were handed back to the former company, while Alfred formed the new Sir Alfred McAlpine & Son. Under a non-compete agreement with its former parent company, Sir Alfred McAlpine confined itself to civil engineering and to the north west of England.

Alfred was appointed High Sheriff of Denbighshire for 1923–24.

Awards
Alfred became a Knight bachelor in the 1932 New Year Honours list. He was appointed an Officer of the Venerable Order of Saint John on 20 December 1937.

Personal life
In 1907 he married Ethel May Williams; they had one son (James) and two daughters (Gladys Gwendoline and Ethel Mary). In 1913, he bought Marchwiel Hall in the village of Marchwiel, Denbighshire in North Wales. Home to the Marchwiel and Wrexham Cricket Club, Alfred developed it as "one of the most picturesque settings for playing the game in the country". Already chairman of the county cricket association, Alfred played cricket for Denbighshire in the 1926–27 season.

References

Sources

1881 births
1944 deaths
20th-century British businesspeople
British construction businesspeople
English company founders
High Sheriffs of Denbighshire
Knights Bachelor
Alfred David
Younger sons of baronets